Tudor Place is a Federal-style mansion in Washington, D.C. that was originally the home of Thomas Peter and his wife, Martha Parke Custis Peter, a granddaughter of Martha Washington. The property, comprising one city block on the crest of Georgetown Heights, had an excellent view of the Potomac River.

History
The original tract of land occupied by Tudor Place was part of the “Rock of Dumbarton” (originally, “Dunbarton”) tract in George Beall’s second addition to Georgetown, an area also known as Georgetown Heights. In 1794, Beall’s grandson, Thomas Beall, sold a portion of his land to Francis Lowndes, a merchant and importer from Bladensburg, Maryland. Lowndes owned the property for eleven years during which he constructed the two wings of the present historic house. Lowndes intended to complete the house but never did, instead selling the property to Martha and Thomas Peter. Martha and Thomas Peter contracted with Dr. William Thornton, who also designed the United States Capitol as well as The Octagon House, to design Tudor Place. From the two wings in existence, Thornton then provided the central structure and the joining elements to the wings - called hyphens, combined them with buff-colored stucco over brick. The "temple" porch and supporting columns provide a most striking addition to the front.

The garden and the collections are as rich and interesting as the home itself. A focal point is the collection of numerous objects that belonged to George and Martha Washington, making Tudor Place the largest public depository of objects belonging to the first Presidential family outside of Mount Vernon.The decorations included four chair-cushions embroidered by Martha Washington in 1801 "executed upon coarse canvas in a design of shells, done in brown and yellow wools, the highlights being flecked in gold-colored silk" as well as a decorative cover for a bed whose trimmings also were embroidered by Martha Washington.

As a historic site that bears the scars of slavery, Tudor Place seeks to look this injustice in the eye. From Martha Washington's will, Martha Parke Custis Peter inherited 90 enslaved people. Enslaved workers and domestic servants worked and lived on site.

On September 28, 1811, Martha Peter's mother, Eleanor Calvert, age 56, a prominent member of the Calvert family of Maryland, Martha Washington's daughter-in-law, and George Washington's stepdaughter-in-law, died at Tudor Place. Martha Peter noted in a February 15, 1812 letter to a friend, Eliza Susan Quincy (1798–1884), how important it was to Martha that she was able to spend the last fortnight of her mother's life with her mother at Tudor Place to render attentions that could not be paid elsewhere.

In March 1813, after resigning his seat in the United States Congress, U.S. educator and political figure Josiah Quincy III and his wife, Eliza Susan Quincy, visited the Peters at Tudor Place. While there, Mrs. Peter gave Josiah General Washington's silver gorget with the ribbon attached to it. Washington's gorget, prominently featured in Charles Willson Peale's 1772 portrait of Colonel George Washington, was a metal collar designed to protect the throat of the wearer and Mrs. Peter had received the gorget at the division of her grandfather's estate. Quincy gave the gorget to the Washington Benevolent Society of Boston in Mrs. Peter's name on April 13, 1813.

On December 18, 1815, and on January 12, 1816, former United States Secretary of State Timothy Pickering visited the Peters at Tudor Place.

Thomas and Martha Peter raised eight children in Tudor Place, and hosted the Marquis de Lafayette during his 1824 tour of the United States. When the third child and eldest son, John Parke Custis Peter, came of age, his father conveyed a farm around Seneca, Maryland. John P.C. Peter built a small replica of Tudor Place from 1828 to 1830 called Montevideo. The farm also included the redstone Seneca Quarry, whose stone Peter would bid on and win the Smithsonian Institution Building project in 1847.

Following the death of Martha Peter in 1854, daughter Britannia Peter Kennon became the next owner of the home. She was the widow of Commodore Beverley Kennon I (1793–1844). following their marriage ceremony in the house.

In about 1869, Robert E. Lee, the former commanding general of the Confederate army in the 1861–1865 American Civil War, paid his last visit to the District of Columbia at Tudor Place before his death on October 12, 1870. By 1874, Tudor Place was occupied by Thos. Beverley Kennon (1830–1890), a grandson of Thomas Peter, a former U.S. Civil War captain with the Confederate Secret Service, and a post U.S. Civil War soldier under the Khedive of Egypt. In 1890, the year that Beverley Kennon died and at a time when Brittania W. Kennon was the oldest living descendant of Mrs. Washington, The Century Illustrated Monthly Magazine published an extensive article that detailed the collection of Martha Washington's relics that were maintained inside Tudor Place.

It was declared a National Historic Landmark in 1960. Tudor Place is located at 1644 31st Street, N.W. and is open to the public.

See also
 Architecture of Washington, D.C.

References

External links

Tudor Place Foundation
Tudor Place: Democracy Starts at Home, from AIArchitect article from May 25, 2007
Tudor Place Digital Media Archive (creative commons-licensed photos, laser scans, panoramas) from Tudor Place Foundation/CyArk partnership

Washington family residences
National Historic Landmarks in Washington, D.C.
Historic house museums in Washington, D.C.
Federal architecture in Washington, D.C.
Georgetown (Washington, D.C.)
Custis family residences
Houses on the National Register of Historic Places in Washington, D.C.
William Thornton buildings
Houses completed in 1815